The RS-26 Rubezh (in Russian: РС-26 Рубеж) (frontier or boundary, also known under the name of its R&D program Avangard Авангард) SS-X-31 or SS-X-29B (another version of SS-27), is a Russian solid-fueled intercontinental ballistic missile, equipped with a thermonuclear MIRV or MaRV payload. The missile is also intended to be capable of carrying the Avangard hypersonic glide vehicle. The RS-26 is based on RS-24 Yars, and constitutes a shorter version of the RS-24 with one fewer stages. The development process of the RS-26 has been largely comparable to that of the RSD-10 Pioneer, a shortened derivative of the RT-21 Temp 2S. Deployment of the RS-26 is speculated to have a similar strategic impact as the RSD-10.

After an initial failure in 2011, it was first test-launched successfully from the Plesetsk Cosmodrome on May 26, 2012, hitting its target at the Kura Range 5,800 km away minutes later. Further successful tests were performed from Kapustin Yar to Sary Shagan in 2012 and 2013. In 2018, however, it was reported that development of the RS-26 had been frozen until at least 2027, with funding diverted toward continued development of the Avangard hypersonic glide vehicle.

Political criticism 

The missile has been criticized by western defense observers for indirectly breaching the INF Treaty. The missile demonstrated, with a light or no payload, the ability to reach above the agreed 5500 km limit of the treaty. However all further testing have been flights with significantly shorter ranges. The RS-26 was twice tested at a distance of about 2000 km. While the RS-26 is technically an ICBM, its range falls just barely inside the ICBM category. According to a US magazine article, the RS-26 is exactly the same concept and a direct replacement for the RDS-10 Pioneer—known to NATO as the SS-20 Saber—which was banned under the INF treaty.

The RS-26 is designed to pose a strategic threat to European capitals and has the ability to target NATO forces in Western Europe. According to an article by Jeffrey Lewis entitled "The Problem With Russia's Missiles", the purpose of these weapons is to deter Western forces from coming to the aid of the NATO's newer eastern members that are located closer to Russia's borders.

See also
 Strategic Missile Troops
 RS-24 Yars
 RS-28 Sarmat
 R-36 (missile)
 UR-100N
 RT-2PM Topol
 RT-2PM2 Topol-M
 LGM-30 Minuteman
 DF-5
 DF-41
 Agni-V

References

Nuclear weapons of Russia
Intercontinental ballistic missiles of Russia
Moscow Institute of Thermal Technology products
Post–Cold War weapons of Russia